Henri Fromageot (10 September 1864 – 1949 ) was a French lawyer and judge. He studied at the University of Paris, University of Oxford and University of Leipzig, gaining a gold medal at Paris in 1891 and serving as the Doctor of Law in the University of Paris Law Faculty. On 19 September 1929 he became a judge of the Permanent Court of International Justice, succeeding André Weiss. He held this position until the judges resigned in October 1945.

References

Bibliography

1864 births
Permanent Court of International Justice judges
1949 deaths
French judges of international courts and tribunals